is a Japanese manga series written and illustrated by Masaki Kasahara. It was serialized in Shueisha's seinen manga magazine Weekly Young Jump from November 2018 to July 2020, with its chapters collected in seven tankōbon volumes.

Publication
Written and illustrated by Masaki Kasahara, Libidors was serialized in Shueisha's seinen manga magazine Weekly Young Jump from November 1, 2018, to July 16, 2020. Shueisha collected its chapters in seven tankōbon volumes, released from February 19, 2019, to August 19, 2020.

Volume list

References

Further reading

External links
 

Seinen manga
Shueisha manga